Margaret Buffieis a Canadian Young Adult Fiction Writer.

Buffie was born in Winnipeg, Manitoba. She attended Sparling Elementary School, Sargeant Park Junior High, and Daniel McIntyre High School. Buffie has a Bachelor of Fine Arts from the University of Manitoba.

She worked as a visual artist before beginning a writing career in 1985. Her first manuscript, a novel entitled Who is Frances Rain? (1987), was published by Kids Can Press in Toronto. This story about a girl who has antique glasses which allow her to see ghosts is considered a "Canadian classic." Her latest novel, Winter Shadows, was published on October 12, 2010, by Tundra Books, a division of Penguin Random House.

Buffie is a recipient of the Vicky Metcalf Award Body of Work Award (For Writing Inspirational to Canadian Youth). She is also a recipient of the Young Adult Canadian Book Award; is a two-time winner of the McNally Robinson Book for Young People award and shortlisted for the Governor Generals Award, as well as being shortlisted for many other awards and honours.

She is married to James Macfarlane and they have one daughter, Christine.

Bibliography
Who is Frances Rain? (1987) Kids Can Press. US Title; The Haunting of Frances Rain, Scholastic Publishing: winner of the Young Adult Canadian Book Award - The Canadian Library Association
The Warnings  (1989), original title; The Guardian Circle, Kids Can Press, Canada International Youth Library Notable Book
My Mother's Ghost (1992) Kids Can Press;  nominated for a Governor General's Award
The Dark Garden (1995) Kids Can Press; winner of the McNally Robinson Book for Young People
Angels Turn Their Backs (1998) Kids Can Press; New York Public Library Books for the Teenager, 1999
The Watcher (2000) Kids Can Press; shortlisted: Young Adult Canadian Book Award (Canadian Library Association)
The Seeker (2002) Kids Can Press; Voya's 18th Annual List of the Best in Science Fiction and Fantasy for the Young Adult Reader, 2003
The Finder (2004) Kids Can Press; winner of The McNally Robinson Book for Young People Award
Out of Focus (2006) Kids Can Press;Top Ten Canadian Books for Young Adults, Ontario Library Association
Winter Shadows (2010) Tundra; Penguin Random House; Winner of the Silver Nautilus Award, (USA); nominated for the Canadian Library Assoc Book of the Year Award

References

External links
 
 
 

1945 births
Living people
Canadian children's writers
University of Manitoba alumni
Writers from Winnipeg